Tyler Tompkins Lussi (born January 26, 1995) is an American professional soccer player who currently plays for North Carolina Courage of the National Women's Soccer League (NWSL). In college she played for the Princeton Tigers.

College career
Lussi played for Princeton Tigers from 2013 to 2016, while majoring in history. In her first season she won the Ivy League Rookie of the Week award three times, becoming the first player to do so in one season, and won Ivy Player of the Week in her first week. She scored 10 goals in 17 games, making her the highest-scoring freshman in 31 years.

In her second season she scored 18 goals in 16 games, and twice won the Ivy League Player of the Week award At the end of the season was selected for the first-team All-Ivy League, first-team All-ECAC, second-team NSCAA All-Mid-Atlantic Region and was picked as the Ivy League Offensive Player of the Year.

In her third season she scored 15 goals in 19 games, winning Ivy League Player of the Week four times. She was picked a second consecutive time as the Ivy League Offensive Player of the Year, and was selected again for the first-team All-Ivy League and for the NSCAA second-team All-America.

In her fourth and final season, she scored 10 goals in 16 games and twice won the Ivy League Player of the Week. At the end of the season she was selected a third consecutive time for the first-team All-Ivy League and also for the NSCAA All-Mid-Atlantic Region first team. During her four-year collegiate career, Lussi established new records with her 53 career goals and 122 career points.

Club career

Portland Thorns FC
Lussi was drafted in the third round of the 2017 NWSL College Draft with the 21st overall pick by the Portland Thorns FC. On July 1, 2017, after a two-week trial, was signed by the club. She made her professional debut a week later, being substituted on in a 1–1 draw against Houston Dash. On August 5, 2017, she scored her first professional goal in a 2–1 victory over Houston Dash.

Angel City FC 
On December 8, 2021, Lussi was traded to Angel City FC along with forward Simone Charley.

North Carolina Courage 
In January 2023, Lussi was traded to North Carolina Courage in exchange for defender Merritt Mathias.

Career statistics

International career
In February 2017, Lussi was called up to the United States under-23 squad for the 2017 La Manga Tournament in Spain. In the tournament she came on as a substitute in the matches against Japan and against England, and started the match against Norway assisting Morgan Andrews for the only goal of the match.

References

External links
 Portland Thorns FC player profile
 

Living people
1995 births
American women's soccer players
National Women's Soccer League players
People from Lutherville, Maryland
Portland Thorns FC draft picks
Portland Thorns FC players
Princeton Tigers women's soccer players
Soccer players from Maryland
Sportspeople from Baltimore County, Maryland
Women's association football forwards
Angel City FC players